Cantharellus subalbidus, the white chanterelle, is a fungus native to California and the Pacific Northwest region of North America. It is a member of the genus Cantharellus along with other popular edible chanterelles.  It is similar in appearance to other chanterelles except for its cream to white color and orange bruising.

Cantharellus subalbidus may form a mycorrhizal association with species of pine, hemlock, Douglas-fir, and Pacific madrone. C. subalbidus has been found to be more common in old-growth forests than in younger forests.

Description
The mushroom is white to cream in color, later darkening to yellow-orange. The stalk is 2–7 cm tall and 1–5 cm wide, tapered, with yellow-brown spots due to bruising and age. The spores are white, elliptical, and smooth.

Similar species
Several other species of chanterelle may be found in western North America:
C. californicus
C. cascadensis
C. cibarius var. roseocanus
C. formosus

Additionally, Leucopaxillus albissimus, Hygrophoropsis aurantiaca, Chroogomphus tomentosus, and species in the genera Craterellus, Gomphus, Omphalotus, and Polyozellus may have a somewhat similar appearance to C. subalbidus.

Uses
A choice edible, they can be prepared by being sautéed or cutting into chunks and baking at 350° Fahrenheit for 10 minutes.

References

External links

subalbidus
Fungi of Canada
Fungi of the United States
Edible fungi
Pacific Northwest cuisine
Fungi described in 1947
Fungi without expected TNC conservation status
Fungi of California